Lewis Singwah Tan (born 4 February 1987) is an English actor and martial artist best known for portraying Lu Xin Lee in Netflix's Wu Assassins, Shatterstar in Deadpool 2 (2018), Gaius Chau in AMC's Into the Badlands and Cole Young in Mortal Kombat (2021).

Early life
Lewis Singwah Tan was born on 4 February 1987 in Salford, England. He was raised primarily in Los Angeles, having lived in China, France, and Spain. His father, Philip Tan, is a Chinese Singaporean martial artist, actor, and stunt coordinator. His mother, Joanne Cassidy, is a retired British fashion model. His family moved to Los Angeles when his father was hired as a fight coordinator for Tim Burton's 1989 film Batman. He is the eldest of four brothers. His brother Sam is also an actor, and his youngest brother Evan is a photographer. Tan's father trained him in martial arts from a young age. He also began training in theatre in his early teens.

Career
Tan performs his own stunts, using multiple styles including Muay Thai, Kung Fu, Ju-Jitsu, and Japanese katana swordplay.

Tan appeared in small supporting roles in other major pictures such as Hangover 3 and Olympus Has Fallen. He began working on major television shows such as CSI: Miami, CSI: NY, NCIS: Los Angeles, Hawaii 5-0, 24, and Rush Hour.

In 2016, Tan was cast in a guest role in the first season of the Netflix television series Iron Fist. He starred in the role of Zhou Cheng. In the same year, Tan was cast in the action film Den of Thieves starring Gerard Butler.

Tan starred as Gaius Chau in the third season of the AMC television series Into the Badlands.

In 2018, Tan starred as Shatterstar in the superhero film Deadpool 2. In the same year, it was announced that Tan was cast in the series regular role of Lu Xin Lee on the Netflix crime drama series, Wu Assassins. Tan reprised his role in the sequel film Fistful of Vengeance. It was released on February 17, 2022.

In August 2019, Tan was cast in the Mortal Kombat reboot as Cole Young. The film was released on 23 April 2021. He was previously involved with the Mortal Kombat media franchise when he underwent filming as Kung Jin for the unreleased web series Mortal Kombat X: Generations; Tan was recruited for the role by Garrett Warren, an experienced action director for live action media productions.

In April 2021, Tan was cast in the leading role of CIA officer Harris Chang on the upcoming television adaptation based on The Quantum Spy thriller novel by David Ignatius.

In May 2021, Tan was cast alongside Emma Roberts in the romantic comedy About Fate, which was directed by Marius Balčiūnas-Weisberg. 

In January 2022, it was announced that Tan would play Tolya Yul-Bataar in the second season of Netflix's Shadow and Bone.

Filmography

Film

Television

References

External links 
 
 

20th-century American male actors
21st-century American male actors
20th-century British male actors
21st-century British male actors
1987 births
American male film actors
American male models
American male television actors
American male actors of Chinese descent
American people of English descent
American people of Singaporean descent
British male actors of Chinese descent
British people of Singaporean descent
British male models
British male film actors
British male television actors
Living people
Male actors from Salford